Luis Contreras (born March 14, 1986) is a Mexican jockey since 2006. After starting his career in Mexico, Contreras started competing in the United States and Canada during the late 2000s. For his graded stakes race career, Contreras has won thirty six Grade III races, twenty two Grade II races and four Grade I races. At the Canadian Triple Crown of Thoroughbred Racing, Contreras won the Queen's Plate, Prince of Wales Stakes, and Breeders' Stakes. His 2011 wins made him the first jockey to use two horses to win the Canadian Triple Crown. In 2014, Contreras came short of another Canadian Triple Crown after finishing tenth at the Breeders' Stakes following wins at the Queen's Plate and Prince of Wales.

As part of the Triple Crown of Thoroughbred Racing, Contreras's best results were sixth at the 2018 Kentucky Derby and third at the 2014 Preakness Stakes. At the Canadian Triple Tiara of Thoroughbred Racing, Contreras won the Woodbine Oaks and Bison City Stakes in 2011 and was fourth at the Wonder Where Stakes that year. For the American Triple Tiara of Thoroughbred Racing, Contreras placed sixth at the 2011 Alabama Stakes. With his Breeders' Cup races between 2011 and 2018, his highest finish was runner-up at the Filly and Mare Sprint event at the 2017 Breeders' Cup. While winning over 2,400 races in his career, Contreras received the Sovereign Award for Outstanding Jockey in 2011 and 2012.

Early life
On March 14, 1986, Contreras was born in Mexico City, Mexico. Growing up, Contreras had hundreds of wins in Mexico after he started his jockey career as a teenager. While racing in Mexico, Contreras had two runner-ups and one top five finish in 2006.

Racing career
Contreras began competing in the United States in 2007 at races held in California and New Mexico. That year, his victories at Golden Gate Fields in 2007 gave Contreras his first American race win and first stakes race win. In 2008, Contreras had his first ever graded stakes race win at the 2008 El Camino Real Derby as a Grade III race.

From 2009 to 2010, Contreras was a jockey for Steve Asmussen in Toronto while on a work permit before he was fired by Asmussen. In 2010, Contreras could work solely for non-Canadian trainers  due to his permit. That year, Contreras thought about leaving Canada before he received an open work permit. Throughout his career, Contreras won at least one Grade III race consecutively between 2011 and 2022. Of his thirty six Grade III wins, Contreras had seven of them in 2013 ranging from the Grey Stakes to the Highlander Stakes.

Contreras won his first of twenty two Grade II events at the 2009 Dance Smartly Stakes. From 2011 to 2022, Contreras won at least one Grade II race except for 2020. During this time period, Contreras won the Canadian Stakes four times with his victories in 2013, 2015, 2018 and 2019. As a Grade I racer, Contreras's first win was at the 2014 Carter Handicap. Contreras additionally won the Northern Dancer Turf Stakes consecutively from 2017 to 2018 and the 2019 E. P. Taylor Stakes.

Triple Crowns
At the Canadian Triple Crown of Thoroughbred Racing, Contreras was tenth at the 2010 Breeders' Stakes. The following year, Contreras was the 2011 Canadian Triple Crown winner with his wins at the Queen's Plate, Prince of Wales Stakes and Breeders' Stakes. During the Canadian Triple Crown in 2011, Contreras had five horses to choose from for the Queen's Plate. With Inglorious and Pender Harbour, Contreras was the first jockey to use two horses to win the Canadian Triple Crown. In 2014, Contreras re-won the Breeders' Stakes after having top three finishes at the Queen's Plate and Prince of Wales. During the 2016 Triple Crown, Contreras was the winner at the Prince of Wales and the runner-up at the Queen's Plate.

In 2017, Contreras missed his second Triple Crown after he was tenth at the Breeders' Stakes following his wins at the Queen's Plate and Prince of Wales. In 2018, Contreras was runner-up at the Queen's Plate and Prince of Wales. The following year, Contreras was second at the Breeders' Stakes and third at the Queen's Plate. Additional top three finishes by Contreras were first place at the 2020 Breeders' Stakes and third place at the 2021 Queen's Plate. In the Triple Crown of Thoroughbred Racing, Contreras was eighteenth at the 2012 Kentucky Derby and sixth at the 2018 Kentucky Derby. At the Preakness Stakes, Contreras had a third-place finish at the 2014 Preakness Stakes and was sixth during the 2018 Preakness Stakes.

Triple Tiaras
For the Canadian Triple Tiara of Thoroughbred Racing, Contreras won both the Woodbine Oaks and the Bison City Stakes in 2011. Contreras failed to win the 2011 Triple Tiara after he finished fourth at the Wonder Where Stakes. Contreras was also the runner-up at Woodbine Oaks in 2012 and 2016. He also finished second at Bison City in 2014. In 2017, Contreras won the Woodbine Oaks and Wonder Where Stakes while coming in fifth at Bison City. At the American Triple Tiara of Thoroughbred Racing, Contreras was sixth at the 2011 Alabama Stakes.

Breeders' Cup
Competing in the Breeders' Cup Challenge, Contreras qualified for the Juvenile Fillies Turf event at the 2011 Breeders' Cup with his win at the Natalma Stakes. After he did not appear at the Juvenile Fillies Turf event, Contreras was seventh in the Juvenile Fillies race and thirteenth at the Juvenile event. In other Breeders' Cup editions, Contreras was sixth in the Juvenile event at the 2012 Breeders' Cup. In the Turf Sprint, Contreras had a fourth-place finish at the 2016 Breeders' Cup. The following year, Contreras was runner-up at the Filly and Mare Sprint event during the 2017 Breeders' Cup. While at the 2018 Breeders' Cup, Contreras raced at the Juvenile, Sprint and Dirt Mile. During these events, Contreras was third in the dirt mile, eighth in the sprint and eleventh in the juvenile.

Overall performance
In December 2018, Contreras won his 2,000th North American race while competing at Woodbine Racetrack. During his career, Contreras has won more than 2,400 races and accumulated over $104 million in prize winnings. In Equibase rankings for North American jockeys, Contreras was in the top 100 for earnings since 2009 and top 100 for wins from 2010 to 2020. His best performances during these years were a seventh place earnings rank in 2011 and a thirteenth place wins rank in 2017. Contreras also received the Sovereign Award for Outstanding Jockey in 2011 and 2012.

References

1986 births
Mexican jockeys
Sovereign Award winners
Living people